Community High School District 117 is a 9-12 high school district based in Lake Villa, Lake County, Illinois that serves both the city where it is based and the village of Antioch, Illinois, alongside Old Mill Creek and Lindenhurst. District 117 is composed of two high schools: Antioch Community High School, which is located in the city of its namesake; and Lakes Community High School, which is, in turn, located in Lake Villa. The district superintendent is Dr. Jeff Feucht. Jori Bowen oversees Lakes as principal,  Eric Hamilton serves as the principal of Antioch.

Both Lakes and Antioch sport a band department and choral department; as well as color guards, various teams, clubs, and honor societies.

External links
Community High School District 117 Home Page
Antioch Community High School
Lakes Community High School

References

School districts in Lake County, Illinois